Cinnyris is a genus of sunbirds. Its members are sometimes included in Nectarinia. They are generally known as double-collared sunbirds because the fringe of their bib usually includes a band of contrastingly coloured feathers.

The sunbirds are a group of very small Old World passerine birds which feed largely on nectar, although they will also take insects, especially when feeding young. Flight is fast and direct on their short wings. Most species can take nectar by hovering like a hummingbird, but usually perch to feed.

Taxonomy
The genus was introduced by the French naturalist Georges Cuvier in 1816. The type species was designated as "Certhia splendida Shaw" by George Robert Gray in 1855. This taxon is a junior synonym of Certhia coccinigaster described by John Latham in 1801. This is now the splendid sunbird. The name Cinnyris is from the Ancient Greek κιννυρις (kinnyris), an unknown small bird mentioned by Hesychius of Alexandria.

It is suspected that the genus is polyphyletic and the positions of many are unresolved:

Species
The genus contains 56 species:

References

Other sources
Barlow, Wacher and Disley, Birds of The Gambia 
Grimmett, Inskipp and Inskipp, Birds of India 
Robson, Craig  A Field Guide to the Birds of Thailand 

 
Taxa named by Georges Cuvier
Bird genera